The Royal Courts of Justice, commonly called the Law Courts, is a court building in Westminster which houses the High Court and Court of Appeal of England and Wales. The High Court also sits on circuit and in other major cities. Designed by George Edmund Street, who died before it was completed, it is a large grey stone edifice in the Victorian Gothic Revival style built in the 1870s and opened by Queen Victoria in 1882. It is one of the largest courts in Europe. It is a Grade I listed building.

It is located on Strand within the City of Westminster, near the border with the City of London (Temple Bar). It is surrounded by the four Inns of Court, St Clement Danes church, The Australian High Commission, King's College London and the London School of Economics. The nearest London Underground stations are Chancery Lane and Temple.

History 

For centuries these courts were located in Westminster Hall; however, in the 19th century, justices decided that a new purpose built structure was seen as needed. Much of the preparatory legal work was completed by Edwin Wilkins Field including promotion of the Courts of Justice Building Act of 1865 and the Courts of Justice Concentration (Site) Act of 1865. A statue of Field stands in the building. Parliament paid £1,453,000 for the  site upon which 450 houses had to be demolished.

The search for a design for the Law Courts was by way of a competition, a then-common approach to selecting a design and an architect. The competition ran from 1866 to 1867 and the twelve architects competing for the contract each submitted designs for the site. In 1868 it was finally decided that George Edmund Street was the winner. Building was started in 1873 by Messrs Bull & Sons of Southampton. Its masons led a serious strike at an early stage which threatened to extend to the other trades and caused a temporary stoppage of the works. In consequence, foreign workmen were brought in – mostly Germans. This aroused bitter hostility on the part of the men on strike, and the newcomers had to be housed and fed within the building. However, these disputes were eventually settled and the building took eight years to complete; it was officially opened by Queen Victoria on 4 December 1882.

Street died before the building was opened, overcome by the work. The building was paid for by cash accumulated in court from the estates of the intestate to the sum of £700,000. Oak work and fittings in the court cost a further £70,000 and with decoration and furnishing the total cost for the building came to under £1 million.

The building was extended to the designs of Sir Henry Tanner to create the West Green building completed in 1912. The Queen's Building followed in 1968 and the Thomas More Courts were completed in January 1990.

The building was used as a "Nightingale Court" for criminal trials during the Covid-19 pandemic in 2021.

Architecture
The design involved a symmetrical main frontage of facing The Strand; the central section, which is stepped back, featured a arched doorway leading to the Great Hall; it had a five-part window in a carved surround on the first floor and a gable containing a rose window above. At the top of the gable was a sculpture of Christ with a flèche behind. There towers containing lancet windows on either side of the central section with side wings beyond. Internally, courts are arranged off the Great Hall which ran north–south; there was a courtyard to the east with offices for courtroom staff arranged round the courtyard. The Great Hall contains a bust of Queen Victoria by the sculptor, Alfred Gilbert.

Architectural historian Nikolaus Pevsner described the building as "an object lesson in free composition, with none of the symmetry of the classics, yet not undisciplined where symmetry is abandoned". David Brownlee claimed that it was influenced by the reformist political movement and the High Victorian architectural movement and described it as a "regular mongrel affair" while Turnor described it as the "last great secular building of the Gothic Revival".

The Government Art Collection contains a painting by Henry Tanworth Wells depicting Queen Victoria opening the building in 1882.

See also 
 Courts of England and Wales
Royal Courts of Justice, Belfast
Parliament House, Edinburgh

References

Sources

Further reading
 
 Sir John Summerson, Victorian Architecture (1970) pp 77–107

External links 

 
 Daily Cause List – Daily list of cases
 360 degree image of the Royal Courts of Justice

1882 establishments in England
Government buildings completed in 1882
Court buildings in London
National government buildings in London
Grade I listed buildings in the City of Westminster
Grade I listed law buildings
G. E. Street buildings
Gothic Revival architecture in London
19th-century architecture in the United Kingdom
Strand, London